Daniel Byrne (born 30 November 1984) is former professional footballer who played as a midfielder. He played for  Manchester United, Hartlepool United (on loan),  Weymouth, Newcastle Town, Mossley, Flixton, Southport, Droylsden, Runcorn F.C. Halton (on loan), Leigh RMI, Witton Albion, Ashton United and Salford City. Internationally, he represented Republic of Ireland.

Playing career

Manchester United
Byrne began his career with Premier League giants Manchester United signing his first professional contract in 2003. On 25 November 2003, Byrne moved on loan to Hartlepool United who were then in League One and chasing for the play-offs. He made his Hartlepool debut in their 2–0 home win over Swindon Town on 29 November 2003. He made one more appearance for Hartlepool in the league – a 4–1 loss to promotion rivals Queens Park Rangers – and one in the FA Cup, a 1–0 televised win over non-league Burton Albion. He returned to Manchester United in December 2003 and was told his contract would not be renewed. Byrne left Manchester United in February 2004. He failed to make a single appearance for the Red Devils.

Non-league career
Following his departure from Manchester United, Byrne had unsuccessful trials at Reading and Walsall. After several months as a free agent, Byrne signed for non-league side Weymouth.

After leaving Weymouth, Byrne went on to play non-league football for Newcastle Town, Mossley, Flixton, Southport, Droylsden, Runcorn F.C. Halton (on loan), Leigh RMI, Witton Albion, Ashton United and Salford City.

While at Droyslden, he was nominated in the Non-League National Game awards. Also during his non-league career, Byrne had an unsuccessful trial with Scottish side Dundee.

International career
In April 2003, Byrne was named in the Irish U-19 national team.

Coaching career
Byrne has previously worked as coach at Salford City.

Personal life
Byrne was born in Frimley, Surrey.

References

External links

Profile at ashtonutd.com

1984 births
Living people
People from Frimley
English footballers
Association football midfielders
Manchester United F.C. players
Hartlepool United F.C. players
Southport F.C. players
Chester City F.C. players
Droylsden F.C. players
Runcorn F.C. Halton players
Leigh Genesis F.C. players
Witton Albion F.C. players
Newcastle Town F.C. players
Mossley A.F.C. players
Flixton F.C. players
Weymouth F.C. players
Ashton United F.C. players
Salford City F.C. players